This article contains the number of cases of coronavirus disease 2019 (COVID-19) reported by each country and territory to the World Health Organization in January 2021 and published in the latter's daily situation reports.

For other months, see COVID-19 pandemic cases. There is also a column there listing the date of the first case for each country. For more international statistics in table and map form, see COVID-19 pandemic by country and territory.

First half

Second half

See also 

COVID-19 pandemic
COVID-19 pandemic cases
COVID-19 pandemic deaths
COVID-19 pandemic death rates by country
COVID-19 pandemic by country and territory#Timeline of first confirmed cases by country or territory

References

External links 
 COVID-19 Risk Factors

Timelines of the COVID-19 pandemic in 2021